William Wandle Wheeler III (born 1966) is a retired United States Navy rear admiral who served as the Chief of Staff of the United States Strategic Command from July 31, 2020 to July 2022. Previously, he was the director of plans and policy of the United States Cyber Command from July 2018 to July 2020. Wheeler graduated from the United States Naval Academy in 1988 with a B.S. degree in oceanography. He later earned a master's degree in national security strategy from the National War College.

References

External links

1966 births
Living people
Place of birth missing (living people)
United States Naval Academy alumni
United States Naval Flight Officers
National War College alumni
United States Navy admirals